The holy anointing oil ("oil of anointing") formed an integral part of the ordination of the priesthood and the High Priest as well as in the consecration of the articles of the Tabernacle (Exodus 30:26) and subsequent temples in Jerusalem.

Originally, the oil was used exclusively for the priests and the Tabernacle articles, but its use was later extended to include kings (1 Samuel 10:1). It was forbidden to be used on an outsider (Exodus 30:33) or to be used on the body of any common person (Exodus 30:32a) and the Israelites were forbidden to duplicate any like it for themselves (Exodus 30:32b).

Some segments of Christianity have continued the practice of using holy anointing oil as a devotional practice, as well as in various liturgies.

A number of religious groups have traditions of continuity of the holy anointing oil, with part of the original oil prepared by Moses remaining to this day. These groups include rabbinical Judaism, the Armenian Church, the Assyrian Church of the East the Coptic Church, the Saint Thomas Nazrani churches, and others.

Hebrew Bible 
The holy anointing oil described in Exodus 30:22–25 was created from:

 Pure myrrh 500 shekels (about )
 Sweet cinnamon 250 shekels (about )
 "Fragrant cane" (sometimes translated as calamus or cannabis) 250 shekels (about )
 Cassia 500 shekels (about )

Etymology 
The Hebrew term "Messiah" (in Greek , Christ) means "the anointed one", and relates to anyone anointed (dedicated to God). The person thus anointed might be a king, a priest, or a prophet.

In the ancient Near East 
Customs varied in the cultures of the Middle East. However, anointing with special oil in Israel was either a strictly priestly or kingly right. When a prophet was anointed, it was because he was first a priest. When a non-king was anointed, such as Elijah's anointing of Hazael and Jehu, it was a sign that Hazael was to become king of Aram (Syria) and Jehu was to become king of Israel. Extra-biblical sources show that it was common to anoint kings in many ancient Near Eastern monarchies. Therefore, in Israel, anointing was not only a sacred act but also a socio-political one.

In the Hebrew Bible, bad smells appear as indications of the presence of disease, decay, rotting processes and death (Exodus 7:18), while pleasant aromas suggest places that were biologically clean and conducive to habitation and/or food production and harvesting. Spices and oils were chosen which assisted man in orienting himself and in creating a sense of safety as well as a sense of elevation above the physical world of decay. The sense of smell was also considered highly esteemed by deity. In Deuteronomy 4:28 and Psalms 115:5-6, the sense of smell is included in connection with the polemics against idols. In the Hebrew Bible God takes pleasure in inhaling the "soothing odor" of offerings (Genesis 8:21; the phrase is also seen in other verses).

To the ancient Israelite there was no oil or fat with more symbolic meaning than olive oil. It was used as an emollient, a fuel for lighting lamps, for nutrition, and for many other purposes. It was scented olive oil that was chosen to be a holy anointing oil for the Israelites.

Identification of kaneh bosem
While sources agree about the identity of four of the five ingredients of anointing oil, the identity of the fifth, "kaneh bosem", has been a matter of debate. The Bible indicates that it was an aromatic cane or grass, which was imported from a distant land by way of the spice routes, and that a related plant grows in Israel (kaneh bosem is referenced as a cultivated plant in the Song of Songs 4:14. Several different plants have been named as possibly being the "kaneh bosem".

Acorus calamus
Most lexicographers, botanists, and biblical commentators translate keneh bosem as "cane balsam". The Aramaic Targum Onkelos renders the Hebrew kaneh bosem in Aramaic as q'nei busma. Ancient translations and sources identify this with the plant variously referred to as sweet cane, or sweet flag (nl. the Septuagint, the Rambam on Kerithoth 1:1, Saadia Gaon and Jonah ibn Janah). This plant is known to botanists as Acorus calamus. According to Aryeh Kaplan in The Living Torah, "It appears that a similar species grew in the Holy Land, in the Hula region in ancient times (Theophrastus, History of Plants 9:7)."

Cymbopogon
Maimonides, in contrast, indicates that it was the Indian plant, rosha grass (Cymbopogon martinii), which resembles red straw. Many standard reference works on Bible plants by Michael Zohary (University of Jerusalem, Cambridge, 1985), James A. Duke (2010), and Hans Arne Jensen (Danish 2004, English translation 2012) support this conclusion, arguing that the plant was a variety of Cymbopogon. James A. Duke, quoting Zohary, notes that it is "hopeless to speculate" about the exact species, but that Cymbopogon citratus (Indian lemon-grass) and Cymbopogon schoenanthus are also possibilities. Kaplan follows Maimonides in identifying it as the Cymbopogon martinii or palmarosa plant.

Cannabis
Sula Benet, in Early Diffusion and Folk Uses of Hemp (1967), identified it as cannabis. Rabbi Aryeh Kaplan notes that "On the basis of cognate pronunciation and Septuagint readings, some identify Keneh bosem with the English and Greek cannabis, the hemp plant. Benet argued that equating Keneh Bosem with sweet cane could be traced to a mistranslation in the  Septuagint, which mistook Keneh Bosem, later referred to as "cannabos" in the Talmud, as "kalabos", a common Egyptian marsh cane plant.

In Rabbinic Judaism
The Talmud asserts that the original anointing oil prepared by Moses remained miraculously intact and was used by future generations without replacement, including in the future Third Temple when it is rebuilt.
Vendyl Jones claimed that such a small quantity of oil (around a gallon) would not last that long (it is claimed that one juglet of oil lasted over 800 years). To explain this discrepancy it is claimed that one of two things occurred: Either the container of holy anointing oil miraculously multiplied (similar to Elijah's multiplication of oil for the widow of Zarephath or the Hanukkah oil miracle) or, following ancient customs, new oil was added to the old thus continuing the original oil for all time.

This is not the only ritual in which Jewish tradition emphasizes continuity. For example, early Jewish rabbis stressed the importance of the succession of classical semikhah and one Jewish tradition teaches that the ashes of the last red heifer sacrificed were always mixed with the ashes of each new red heifer.

In Christianity

Anointing oil is used in Christian communities for various reasons. Anointing of the sick is prescribed in this passage in the New Testament,

The epithet "Christ" as a title for Jesus refers to "the anointed one".

In the Armenian Church
The holy anointing oil of the Armenian Church is called the holy muron ('muron' means myrrh). The church holds a special reverence for the continuity factor of the oil. According to tradition, a portion of the holy anointing oil of Exodus 30, which Moses and Aaron had blessed, still remained in Jesus' time. Jesus Christ blessed this oil and then gave some of it to Thaddeus, who took the holy oil to Armenia and healed King Abkar of a terrible skin disease by anointing him with the holy oil. Saint Thaddeus is said to have buried a bottle of the holy anointing oil in Daron under an evergreen tree. Saint Gregory the Illuminator discovered the hidden treasure and mixed it with muron that he had blessed. It is said that "To this day, whenever a new batch of muron is prepared and blessed, a few drops of the old one go into it, so that the Armenian muron always contains a small amount of the original oil blessed by Moses, Jesus Christ, and Gregory the Illuminator."

The holy muron is composed of olive oil and forty-eight aromas and flowers. The remaining portion of the previous blessed holy oil is poured into the newly prepared oil during the blessing ceremony and passes the blessing from generation to generation. It is said that this very procedure has been followed for nearly 1700 years. The Catholicos of all Armenians in Etchmiadzin combines a new mixture of holy muron in the cauldron every seven years using a portion of the holy muron from the previous blend. This is distributed to all of the Armenian churches throughout the world. Before Christianity, muron was reserved solely for the enthroning of royalty and for very special events. In later years, it was used with extreme unction and to heal the sick, and to anoint ordained clergy.

In the Assyrian Church of the East
It is said by the Assyrian Church that the holy anointing oil "was given and handed down to us by our holy fathers Mar Addai and Mar Mari and Mar Tuma." The holy anointing oil of the Assyrian Church is variously referred to as the Oil of the Holy Horn, the Oil of the Qarna, or the Oil of Unction. This holy oil is an apostolic tradition, believed to have originated from the oil consecrated by the apostles themselves, and which by succession has been handed down in the Church to this day. The original oil which the disciples blessed began to run low and more oil was added to it. The Assyrian Church believes that this has continued to this very day with new oil being added as the oil level lowers. This succession of holy oil is believed to be a continuity of the blessings placed upon the oil from the beginning.

Both the Oil of Unction and the Holy Leaven are referred to as "leaven" although there is no actual leavening agent, so the nomenclature Holy Leaven seems to be a bit misleading. Yohanan bar Abgareh referred to it in 905 as did Shlemon d-Basra in the 13th century. Yohanan bar Zo’bee in the 14th century integrated the Holy Oil of unction with baptism and other rites. Isaaq Eshbadhnaya in the 15th century wrote the Scholion which is a commentary on specific theological topics. It tells us that John the Baptist gave John the Evangelist a baptismal vessel of water from Christ’s baptism, which was collected by John the Baptist from water dripping from Christ after his baptism in Jordan River. Jesus gave each disciple a "loaf," at the Last Supper, but the Scholion informs us that to John he gave two with the instructions to eat only one and to save the other. At the crucifixion John collected the water from the Lord's side in the vessel and the blood he collected on the loaf from the Last Supper. After the descent of the Holy Spirit on Pentecost the disciples took the vessel and mixed it with oil and each took a horn of it. The loaf they ground up and added flour and salt to it. Each took a portion of the holy oil and the holy bread which were distributed in every land by the hand of those who missionized there.

The Assyrian Church has two types of holy oils; the one is ordinary olive oil, blessed or not blessed, the other is the oil of the Holy Horn which is believed to have been handed down from the apostles. The Holy Horn is constantly renewed by the addition of oil blessed by a bishop on Maundy Thursday. While almost anyone can by tradition be anointed with the regular oil, the oil of the Holy Horn is restricted for ordination and sanctification purposes.

In the Coptic Church
The holy anointing oil of the Coptic Church is referred to as the holy myron ('myron' means myrrh). The laying on of hands for the dwelling of the Holy Spirit is believed to have been a specific rite of the apostles and their successors the bishops, and as the regions of mission increased, consequently numbers of Christian believers and converts increased. It was not possible for the apostles to wander through all the countries and cities to lay hands on all of those baptized, so they established anointment by the holy myron as an alternative, it is believed, for the laying on of the hands for the Holy Spirit’s indwelling.

The first who made the myron were the apostles who had kept the fragrant oils which were on the body of Jesus Christ during his burial, and they added the spices which were brought by those women who prepared them to anoint Christ, but had discovered he had been resurrected. They melted all these spices in pure olive oil, prayed on it in the upper room in Zion, and made it a holy anointing oil. They decided that their successors, the bishops, must renew the making of the myron whenever it is nearly used up, by incorporating the original oil with the new. Today the Coptic Church uses it for ordination, in the sanctification of baptismal water, and in the consecration of churches and church altars and vessels.

It is said that when St. Mark went to Alexandria, he took with him some of the holy myron oil made by the apostles and that he used it in the sacrament of Chrism, as did the patriarchs who succeeded him. This continued until the era of Athanasius the Apostolic, the 20th patriarch, who then decided to remake the myron in Alexandria. Hence, it is reported, he prepared all of the needed perfumes and spices, with pure olive oil, from which God ordered Moses to make the holy anointing oil as specified in the recipe in the thirtieth chapter of the book of Exodus. Then the sanctification of the holy myron was fulfilled in Alexandria, and Athanasius was entrusted with the holy oil, which contained spices which touched Jesus’s body while it was in the tomb, as well as the original oil which had been prepared by the apostles and brought to Egypt by St. Mark. He distributed the oil to the churches abroad: to the See of Rome, Antioch and Constantinople, together with a document of its authenticity, and all of the patriarchs are said to have rejoiced in receiving it.

The Coptic Church informs that the fathers of the Church and scholars like St. Justin Martyr, Tertullian, St. Hippolytus, Origen, St. Ambrose, and St. Cyril of Jerusalem, spoke about the holy myron and how they received its use in anointing by tradition. For example, St. Hippolytus in his Apostolic Tradition, speaks of the holy oil "according to ancient custom" Origen writes about the holy oil "according to the tradition of the church" St. Cyril of Jerusalem goes into further detail in speaking about the grace of the Holy Spirit in the holy myron: "this oil is not just any oil: after the epiclesis of the Spirit, it becomes charism of Christ and power of the Holy Spirit through the presence of the deity".

The early fathers and scholars mention the use of the holy myron, as well as a documentation by Abu'l-Barakat Ibn Kabar, a 14th-century Coptic priest and scholar, in his book Misbah az-Zulmah fi idah al-khidmah (The Lamp of Darkness in Clarifying the Service). According to his account, the holy apostles took from the spices that were used to anoint the body of Jesus Christ when he was buried, added pure olive oil to it, and prayed over it in Upper Zion, the first church where the Holy Spirit fell in the upper room.

This holy oil was then distributed among all of the apostles so that wherever they preached, new converts would be anointed with it as a seal. They also commanded that whenever a new batch of Holy Myron was made, they add to it the old holy myron to keep the first holy myron continually with all that would ever be made afterwards.

According to the available resources, the holy myron in the Church of Egypt has been made 34 times.

Among the Saint Thomas Christians and Nasranis
According to tradition, St. Thomas laid the original foundation for Christianity in India. It is reported that Jewish communities already present in India enticed Thomas to make his missionary journey there. It is said that he brought holy anointing oil with him and that the St. Thomas Christians still have this oil to this day.

Patriarch Ya`qub, of the Syrian Malabar Nasrani Church, is remembered for his celebration of the liturgy and his humble encouragement to accept the simple way of life. After he consecrated sacred myron in the Mor Gabriel monastery in 1964, holy myron flowed from the glass container the following day and many people were said to have been healed by it.

In Mandaeism

In Mandaeism, anointing sesame oil, called misha in Mandaic, is used during rituals such as the masbuta (baptism) and masiqta (death mass), both of which are performed by Mandaean priests.

See also
 Abramelin oil
 Holy water
 Shemen Afarsimon, oil of persimmon, in the Mishnah
 Washing and anointing

References

Religious objects
Christian terminology
Oils
Tabernacle and Temples in Jerusalem
Judaism terminology
Myrrh